Bailing is the process of falling off a board (i.e. a skateboard), losing control of the board while performing a trick in the air, or when the board hits the ground on the deck and not the wheels. Bailing can sometimes result in some type of injury.

Background
Bailing occurs in at least two forms.  The first form is an unintentional fall/crash (loss of control) through loss of balance, foot/object contact with wheel, loss of traction, speed wobbles, etc.  The second form is a controlled bail, which implies some level of control loss, but is not considered to be an especially painful bail as injury level is reduced.  

A third form of bailing can mean a slide (sliding out) or maneuver executed in a controlled and practiced manner to avert a hard fall that may cause injury.  Sliding out occurs with the full use of pads, especially knee and hand/wrist protection.  'Running it out' is a maneuver whereby the rider completely steps or jumps off of an object such as a skateboard and runs to slow down remaining momentum.

See also
Glossary of surfing

References

External links

Boardsports
Surfing terminology